The Baltic area runestones are Varangian runestones in memory of men who took part in peaceful or warlike expeditions across the Baltic Sea, where Finland and the Baltic states are presently located.

Beside the runestones treated in this article and in the main article Varangian runestones, there are many other runestones that talk of eastward voyages such as the Greece runestones, Italy runestones, and inscriptions left by the Varangian Guard. Other runestones that deal with Varangian expeditions include the Ingvar runestones (erected in honor or memory of those who travelled to the Caspian Sea with Ingvar the Far-Travelled). In addition, there were also voyages to Western Europe mentioned on runestones that are treated in the articles Viking runestones, England runestones and Hakon Jarl runestones.

Below follows a presentation of the runestones based on the Rundata project. The transcriptions into Old Norse are mostly in the Swedish and Danish dialect to facilitate comparison with the inscriptions, while the English translation provided by Rundata gives the names in the de facto standard dialect (the Icelandic and Norwegian dialect):

Uppland

U 180

This runestone is possibly in style Pr4 and it is located at the church of Össeby-Garn. It was made by the runemaster Visäte. The stone commemorates a man who either died in Viborg, Jutland, or in Vyborg, Karelia. Part of the inscription's text "he died in Véborg" is written on the design's cross, which may have indicated to those at home that Sigsteinn, while dying abroad, had received proper Christian burial treatment.

Latin transliteration:

 

Old Norse transcription:

 

English translation:

 "Sighvatr and Þorbjǫrn and Þorgrímr and Erinmundr had the stone raised in memory of their brother Sigsteinn. He died in Véborg."

U 214

This runestone from c. 1100 is in the style RAK. It is in the wall of the porch of the church of Vallentuna. The U 215 contains the first part of the message. The stones were carved in memory of a man who drowned in Holmr's sea, but runologists are divided on the meaning of the expression. One interpretation proposed by Jansson is that it means the "Novgorodian sea" and refers to the Gulf of Finland. The runestone provides the earliest Swedish attestation of an end rhyme, whereas the earliest Old Norse attestation is Höfuðlausn composed by Egill Skallagrímsson.

Latin transliteration:

 

Old Norse transcription:

 

English translation:

 "... and Ingibjǫrg in memory of her husbandman. He drowned in Holmr's sea - his cargo-ship drifted to the sea-bottom - only three came out (alive)."

Swedish translation:

 ""

U 346

This runestone has disappeared but it was located at the church of Frösunda. It was made by the runemaster Åsmund Kåresson in style Pr3-Pr4, and it was raised in memory of a man who died in Virland. It contains the same message as U 356.

Latin transliteration:

 

Old Norse transcription:

 

English translation:

 "Ragnfríðr had this stone erected in memory of Bjǫrn, her son and Ketilmundr's. He fell in Virland. May God and God's mother help his spirit. Ásmundr marked the right runes."

U 356

This runestone in style Pr3 is located in Ängby. It was made by the runemaster Åsmund Kåresson for a lady in memory of her son who died in Virland. It contains the same message as U 346.

Latin transliteration:

 

Old Norse transcription:

 

English translation:

 "Ragnfríðr had this stone raised in memory of Bjǫrn, her son and Ketilmundr's. May God and God's mother help his spirit. He fell in Virland. And Ásmundr marked."

U 439
This runestone in style Fp is one of the Ingvar Runestones and due to uncertainties as to the decipherment also one of the Serkland Runestones. It was located at Steninge Palace, but it is lost. Johan Bureus, one of the first prominent Swedish runologists, visited Steninge on May 8, 1595, and made a drawing of the runestone which stood by the jetty. Only 50 years later it had disappeared and in a letter written in 1645 it was explained that the stone had been used in the construction of a new stone jetty. The inscription contained an Old Norse poem.

Latin transliteration:

 

Old Norse transcription:

 

English translation:

 "Herleif and Þorgerðr had this stone raised in memory of Sæbjǫrn, their father, who steered a ship east with Ingvarr to Estonia(?)/Serkland(?)."

U 533

This runestone is in the wall inside the porch of the church of Roslags-Bro. It is in style Pr1, and it was raised in memory of a man who died in Virland (in Estonia). The style shows that it was made by the runemaster Torbjörn Skald.

Latin transliteration:

 * sigruþ * lit + raisa * stain * eftir + anunt * sun * sin * han uas ' tribin + a + uirlanti

Old Norse transcription:

 Sigruð let ræisa stæin æftiʀ Anund, sun sinn. Hann vas drepinn a Virlandi.

English translation:

 "Sigþrúðr had the stone raised in memory of ǫnundr, her son. He was killed in Virland."

U 582

This runestone has disappeared but it was located at the church of Söderby-Karl. It was possibly in style Pr1 and it commemorated a son who died in what is called Finland. At this time, Finland referred to the south-western part of what today is Finland.

Latin transliteration:

 [biarn huk * ikulfriþ : raistu : stain : aftʀ : utrik : sun : sain * han * uaʀ : tribin : o * fin*lonti]

Old Norse transcription:

 Biorn ok Igulfrið ræistu stæin æftiʀ Otrygg, sun sinn. Hann vaʀ drepinn a Finnlandi.

English translation:

 "Bjǫrn and Ígulfríðr raised the stone in memory of Ótryggr, their son. He was killed in Finland."

U 698

This runestone has disappeared but it was located at the church of Veckholm. It was in style Pr2-Pr3. The inscription was considered difficult to read, but it refers to a man who fell in Livonia, and possibly in an expedition led by Freygeirr.

Latin transliteration:

 P [sufar lit : aristn * þin * afir * askir sun : sin : han * ut fai : a liflai|n|þ|i| |i| |i|n|þ|i * frai...]
 Q [sufar lit : aristn * þin * afir * askir sun : sin : han * ut fai : a liflai|n|þ| i| |i|n|þ|i * frai...]

Old Norse transcription:

 P <sufar> let ræisa stæin æftiʀ Asgæiʀ, sun sinn. Hann uti fioll a Liflandi i liði Frøy[gæiʀs](?).
 Q <sufar> let ræisa stæin æftiʀ Asgæiʀ, sun sinn. Hann ut fioll a Lifland i liði Frøy[gæiʀs](?).

English translation:

 "<sufar> had the stone raised in memory of Ásgeirr, his son. He fell in Lífland, abroad in Freygeirr's(?) retinue."

Södermanland

Sö 39

This is a runic inscription on bedrock at Åda. It is in style Pr3 and it commemorates a brother who drowned in Livonia.

Latin transliteration:

 : hermoþr : lit : hagua : at : barkuiþ : bruþur : sin : h[an] trukn-þi : [a] lf:lanti :

Old Norse transcription:

 Hærmoðr let haggva at Bergvið/Barkvið, broður sinn. Hann drunkn[a]ði a Liflandi.

English translation:

 "Hermóðr had (the rock) cut in memory of Bergviðr/Barkviðr, his brother. He drowned in Lífland."

Sö 198

This runestone in style Fp is found in Mervalla on the island of Selaön in lake Mälaren. It is raised in memory of a man who regularly sailed a valuable knarr to Zemgale, passing Cape Kolka (Dómisnes). North of the Cape there is a long underwater reef which probably was infamous among the sailors of the Viking Age, and this is probably why Sigríðr wanted posterity to know that her husband had often passed it. The expression dyrum knærri ("valued cargo-ship") is an instrumental dative and it also appears in a famous stanza by the Icelander Egill Skallagrímsson. Egill had written that his mother had promised him a fast ship so that he could sail with the Vikings and

Latin transliteration:

 siriþ * lit * resa * stan * [þin](a) [*] (a)(t) * suen * sin * [b]unta * h[n] * uft * siklt * til * simk(a)(l)(a) * t(u)ru[m] * knari * um * tumisnis

Old Norse transcription:

 Sigrið let ræisa stæin þenna at Svæin, sinn bonda. Hann oft siglt til Sæimgala, dyrum knærri, um Domisnæs.

English translation:

 "Sigríðr had this stone raised in memory of Sveinn, her husbandman. He often sailed a valued cargo-ship to Seimgalir, around Dómisnes."

Gästrikland

Gs 13

This runestone in sandstone is found in the church of the holy trinity in Gävle. It is in style Pr2 and it commemorates a brother name Egill who died in Tavastia. Åsmund Kåresson was one of the runemasters. Egill probably fell in a leidang expedition, led by Freygeirr who was a military leader.

Latin transliteration:

 × brusi lit rita s-... ... [(a)]b--ʀ (i)h(i)(l) brur sin : in h-n uarþ tauþr a tafstalonti × þo brusi furþi lank lans ' abtiʀ [br](u)r sin h(o)[n] fur (m)iʀ fraukiʀi kuþ hialbi hons| |salu| |uk| |kuþ(s) (m)(u)[þiʀ ' suain ' uk osmunrt ' þaiʀ markaþu] +

Old Norse transcription:

 Brusi let retta s[tæin þenna] æf[ti]ʀ Ægil, broður sinn. En h[a]nn varð dauðr a Tafæistalandi, þa Brusi førði læiðang(?) lands æftiʀ broður sinn. Hann for meðr Frøygæiʀi. Guð hialpi hans salu ok Guðs moðiʀ. Svæinn ok Asmundr þæiʀ markaðu.

English translation by Sven B.F Jansson 1981:

 "Brúsi had this stone erected in memory of Egill, his brother. And he died in Tafeistaland, when Brúsi brought (= led?) the land's levy(?) He travelled with Freygeirr. May God and God's mother help his soul. Sveinn and Ásmundr, they marked."

English translation by Henrik Williams 2005:

 "Brúsi had this stone erected in memory of Egill, his brother. And he died in Tafeistaland, when Brúsi bore long-spear (=battle standard) after his brother. He travelled with Freygeirr. May God and God's mother help his soul. Sveinn and Ásmundr, they marked."

Västergötland

Vg 181

This runestone in style Pr1 is found at Frugården. It was raised in memory of a man who died in Estonia.

Latin transliteration:

 kufi : rsþi : stin : þesi : eftʀ : ulaf : sun : sin * trk * hrþa * kuþan * hn * uarþ * trbin * i * estlatum * hu(a)rþ(r) * iuk * s---

Old Norse transcription:

 Gufi ræisti stæin þennsi æftiʀ Olaf, sun sinn, dræng harða goðan. Hann varð drepinn i Æistlandum. Havarðr(?) hiogg s[tæin].

English translation:

 "Gufi raised this stone in memory of Ólafr, his son, a very good valiant man. He was killed in Estonia. Hávarðr(?) cut the stone."

Gotland

G 135

This runestone, originally located in Sjonhems, tells of the same family as G 134 and G 136, and it was made in memory of a man who died in Vindau (Ventspils, Latvia).

Latin transliteration:

 þina : eftir : a(i)--- : --- : --rþ : tauþr : a : ui(t)au : systriʀ : [tuaʀ] ...-ʀ : bryþr : þria : roþanþr : auk : roþkutr : roþar : auk : þorstain : þiʀ : iʀu : faþur:bryþr

Old Norse transcription:

 Þenna æftiʀ Æi... ... [va]rð dauðr a Vindau/Vindö. Systriʀ tvaʀ ... brøðr þria. Hroðvaldr(?) ok Hroðgautr, Hroðarr ok Þorstæinn, þæiʀ eʀu faðurbrøðr.

English translation:

 "This (one) in memory of Ei-... (who) died at Vindey/Vindö. Two sisters ... three brothers. Hróðvaldr(?) and Hróðgautr, Hróðarr and Þorsteinn, they are the father's brothers."

G 319

This is a late runic inscription on a grave which is dated to the early 13th century. It is located in Rute Church and it commemorates a man who died in Finland.

Latin transliteration:

 si[h]tris : aruar[r] : litu : giera : st[a]en : yfir : auþu-l- : broþur : sin : a : finlandi : do : aglia...

Old Norse transcription:

 Sigtryggs(?) arfaʀ letu gæra stæinn yfiʀ Auðv[a]l[d](?), broður sinn, a Finnlandi do <aglia...>.

English translation:

 "Sigtryggr's(?) heirs had the stone made over Auðvaldr(?), their brother, who died in Finland ..."

References and sources
References

Sources

 
 Jansson, Sven B. F. (1980). Runstenar. STF, Stockholm. 
 
 Peterson, Lena. Nordisk Runnamnslexikon Swedish Institute for Linguistics and Heritage (Institutet för språk och folkminnen).
 Pritsak, Omeljan. (1981). The Origin of Rus'''. Cambridge, Mass.: Distributed by Harvard University Press for the Harvard Ukrainian Research Institute. 
 Project Samnordisk Runtextdatabas Svensk - Rundata
 Williams, Henrik. (2005). Vittnat runstenen från Söderby (Gs 13) om Sveriges första ledungståg? Runfilologi och konsten att läsa som det står''. ISSN 0349-0416

External links
 An English Dictionary of Runic Inscriptions of the Younger Futhark, at the University of Nottingham

Runestones in Uppland
Runestones in Östergötland
Runestones in Södermanland
Runestones in memory of Viking warriors
Gotland